Robert Edward Difenderfer (June 7, 1849 – April 25, 1923) was a Democratic member of the U.S. House of Representatives from Pennsylvania.

Biography
Robert E. Difenderfer was born in Lewisburg, Pennsylvania.  He attended the common schools and studied dentistry and practiced this profession for fourteen years in Lewisburg and Pottsville, Pennsylvania.  He built and operated the first woolen mill at Tianjin, China.  He returned to the United States in August 1900, where he engaged in the wholesale lumber business and as a contractor at Jenkintown, Pennsylvania.

Difenderfer was elected as a Democrat to the Sixty-second and Sixty-third Congresses.  He was an unsuccessful candidate for renomination in 1914, 1916, and 1918.  He was engaged in the retail confectionery business at Jenkintown, and died in Philadelphia, Pennsylvania in 1923.  Interment in Westminster Cemetery, Bala Cynwyd.

Sources

The Political Graveyard

External links

1849 births
1923 deaths
Politicians from Pottsville, Pennsylvania
American expatriates in China
American dentists
People from Lewisburg, Pennsylvania
Democratic Party members of the United States House of Representatives from Pennsylvania